The Songs of Distant Earth is a 1986 science fiction novel by British writer Arthur C. Clarke, based upon his 1958 short story of the same title. He stated that it was his favourite of all his novels. Clarke also wrote a short step outline with the same title, published in Omni magazine and anthologized in The Sentinel in 1983.

The novel tells of a utopian human colony in the far future that is visited by travellers from a doomed Earth, as the Sun has gone nova. The Songs of Distant Earth explores apocalyptic, atheistic, and utopian ideas, as well as the effects of long-term interstellar travel and extra-terrestrial life.

Plot summary
The novel is set in the early 3800s and takes place almost entirely on the faraway oceanic planet of Thalassa. Thalassa has a small human population sent there by way of an embryonic seed pod, one of many sent out from Earth in an attempt to continue the human race before the Earth was destroyed.

The story begins with an introduction of the Thalassans – the marine biologist Brant, his partner Mirissa and her brother Kumar. They are typical examples of the Thalassan culture; quiet, stable, and free from religion and supernatural influence. Their peaceful existence comes to an end with the arrival of the Magellan, an interstellar spaceship from Earth containing one million colonists who have been put into cryonic suspension.

In a series of descriptive passages, the events leading up to the race to save the human species are explained. Scientists in the 1960s discover that the neutrino emissions from the Sun – a result of the nuclear reactions that fuel the star – are far diminished from expected levels. At a secret session of the International Astronomical Union it is confirmed that the Sun will become a nova around the year AD 3600.

Over a period of centuries humanity develops advanced technologies to send out seeding ships containing human and other mammalian embryos (and later on, simply stored DNA sequences), along with robot parents, to planets that are considered habitable. One such ship is sent to the far off ocean world of Thalassa and successfully establishes a small human colony in the year 3109. Sending live humans is ruled out due to the immense amount of fuel that a rocket-propelled spacecraft would have to carry to first accelerate to the speeds required to travel such great distances within an acceptable time, and then decelerate upon approaching the destination. This limitation is however overcome with the development of the Quantum Drive less than a hundred years before the Sun is set to become a nova. This scientific breakthrough allows the construction of a fleet of crewed interstellar vehicles, including the starship Magellan. The Magellan escapes the Earth three years before the Sun explodes, an event that is witnessed by the Magellan'''s crew.

In the intervening years the colony on Thalassa loses contact with Earth due to the destruction of its communication abilities by a volcanic eruption 400 years after its founding. The giant radio dish is never repaired due to an ingrained tendency to procrastinate, a trait common among the Thalassans. The Thalassans are therefore unaware of later developments on Earth, including crewed interstellar travel. The Earth assumes the destruction of the colony as well.

Two hundred and fifty years after the end of Earth the Magellan arrives at Thalassa, the midpoint of a 550-year voyage to colonise the distant ice planet Sagan 2. Primarily the objective is to replenish the ship's mammoth ice shield that had prevented micrometeors from damaging it during its interstellar journey. Thalassa is the obvious choice for this operation, as 95% of the planet's surface is covered by water. However, it soon becomes apparent that the human colony is still present and flourishing.  Aboard are several crew members, awakened by the ship to undertake the mission, and 900,000 sleeping passengers. Among the crew is Loren Lorenson, a young engineer, and Moses Kaldor, an eminent and wise counsellor.

The arrival of the visitors from Earth is a monumental event for the easygoing Thalassans, who never expected to see or hear from any other human beings. To the crew of the Magellan it is a welcome surprise to meet the natives and sample the pleasures of a beautiful and hospitable planet. A tale of love and tragedy starts to develop as Loren and Mirissa quickly fall in love, a situation that demonstrates the different level of social mores between the two cultures. The Thalassans appear free from monogamy and sexual possessiveness, a situation that the lonely and troubled crew quickly find out.

Due to this and other aspects of the Thalassans' way of life, and the duration of the stay on the planet to repair the ship's ice shield, a small contingent of the crew quickly becomes disenchanted with the original objective of the mission, leading to a threat of mutiny.

A more gentle and parental relationship also develops between Mirissa and Moses, a man deeply affected by the destruction of Earth and the loss of his wife. Moses soon provides Mirissa an insight into the culture and ways of Earth lost to the Thalassans, including the concepts of war and religion, concepts alien to the gentle Thalassans.

During the course of the stay, and due to the construction of a massive plant for freezing the huge ice blocks for the shield, the Terrans and the Thalassans become aware of the existence of a potentially intelligent sea creature living in the depths of the Thalassan oceans. The "scorps" are similar to the sea scorpions of Earth, only much larger. It soon becomes evident that the scorps are responsible for the theft of metals and wire from several Thalassan underwater projects, including a fish trapping tool being developed by Brant. The intelligence of these creatures is questioned by most, but Moses believes they may have the potential for developing into a future intelligent species.

Several unforeseen events occur that shatter the dream of idyllic life of Thalassa, and also remind the crew and the Thalassans that the visitors must soon continue their prime mission, and leave the Thalassans to their destiny.

The story concludes with an air of tragedy and hope, as the relationship between Brant and Mirissa and Loren ends; the transient nature and ultimate futility of their love revealed. Mirissa chooses to conceive a child by Loren, but a change in scheduling of the mission brought about by the threat of mutiny by the crew means he will never see his son. Brant accepts the child as his own.

The dissatisfied elements of the crew are left on Thalassa while the rest leave on the last leg of their journey. Loren witnesses the life of Mirissa and his child after awakening on Sagan 2, three hundred years after their deaths.

Scientific aspects
The novel explores one possible outcome of the solar neutrino problem, which was unsolved when Clarke wrote the work but has since been explained. There seemed to be a lack of neutrinos reaching the Earth from the Sun, because scientists were only looking for one particular state of the neutrino particle.

In the 'Acknowledgements' section of the book, Clarke explains why he chose vacuum energy for spacecraft propulsion – speculated as scientifically viable, but highly futuristic technology.

The novel also features a space elevator. In his introduction to the novel, Clarke states that he wished the work to deal with a realistic interstellar voyage, without the use of warp drives or other fantastic technologies.  That the "quantum drive" is ironically of the same nature was not acknowledged by Clarke.

Setting
In the story "Songs of Distant Earth" there are 10 known colonies of Earth, most of which have lost contact with Earth. Several planets  are mentioned by name: 
Earth is the Mother world to the human race, destroyed 400 years prior to the story due to the Sun going nova. The Magellan was the last refugee ship to leave before the sun exploded. The word Earth is hard for the people of Thalassa to say due to its loss.
Thalassa is the world on which most of the story takes place. It is an ocean world with three volcanic islands, and its own aquatic biota. The planet was colonized by a seed ship. The protagonists live on the southern of the three inhabited islands, and based on the limited physical descriptions and their names appear to be of mixed ethnic background.
Pasadena is a planet in orbit around Alpha Centauri A. Earth has lost contact with the colony there but it may still be thriving.
Sagan Two is the destination of the star ship Magellan, located seventy-five light years from Thalassa. It is an untouched but Mars-like icy planet, larger than Earth, with about forty percent ocean and a mean temperature of twenty-five degrees. The atmosphere has an oxygen content seventy percent of Earth's and it was named for science communicator Carl Sagan.
Sirius X is a colony of Earth mentioned in the story.

Cross-media influences
Multi-instrumentalist and composer Mike Oldfield wrote an entire album based on – and entitled – The Songs of Distant Earth, which was released in 1994. The album has a foreword written by Clarke. Oldfield included a CD-ROM multi-media interactive exploration animation software on some of the locations from the book, including the "Hibernaculum". The album has been re-released in a package with the original short story, the movie outline and the CD-ROM.

The ending song and final chapter of Muv-Luv Unlimited are both named after The Songs of Distant Earth, following the theme of every chapter having been named after a relevant or semi-relevant sci-fi story.

The final part of 1987 science fiction anime Space Fantasia 2001 Nights is named "The Songs of Distant Earth".

ReceptionThe Songs of Distant Earth received a positive review from Gerald Jones in The New York Times. Jones praised its scope and its exploration of philosophical dilemmas: "The drama that interests Mr. Clarke is played out on a much larger canvas. It concerns the lures and limitations of knowledge, the destiny of mankind, and the fate of the universe."

Dave Langford reviewed The Songs of Distant Earth for White Dwarf'' #81, and stated that "Let's face it, Clarke's characters can only manage three emotions: intellectual hunger, sorrow for bygone glories (here a nova-zapped Earth), and awe in the face of the infinite. None is appropriate to a bittersweet love affair; with this vacuum at the book's core, the other bits don't fuse together but just lie there. Pity."

References

Further reading

External links
 
 
 "The Songs of Distant Earth" (short story) on the Internet Archive

1986 science fiction novels
1986 British novels
1958 short stories
Fiction set in the 4th millennium
Grafton (publisher) books
Novels by Arthur C. Clarke
Short stories by Arthur C. Clarke
Fiction set on ocean planets
Books with cover art by Michael Whelan